Julie White (born 1 June 1960) is a Canadian athlete. She competed in the women's high jump at the 1976 Summer Olympics.

References

1960 births
Living people
Athletes (track and field) at the 1976 Summer Olympics
Athletes (track and field) at the 1978 Commonwealth Games
Canadian female high jumpers
Olympic track and field athletes of Canada
Sportspeople from Ontario
Commonwealth Games medallists in athletics
Commonwealth Games bronze medallists for Canada
Medallists at the 1978 Commonwealth Games